The men's javelin throw event at the 1932 Olympic Games took place August 4.

Results

Final standings

Key: OR = Olympic record

References

Men's javelin throw
Javelin throw at the Olympics
Men's events at the 1932 Summer Olympics